Sir Arnold Stanley Vincent Burgen FRS (20 March 1922 – 26 May 2022) was a British physician, pharmacologist, academic and university administrator. He was Master of Darwin College, Cambridge, from 1982–89, Deputy Vice-Chancellor of The University of Cambridge from 1985–89, and founding President of the Academia Europæa.

Early life
Burgen was born in Clapton, East London. He attended Christ's College Finchley, a grammar school in Finchley, north London. He was subsequently a student at the Middlesex Hospital Medical School beginning in 1945; (now part of University College, London) before going on to become a Doctor of Medicine in 1950.

Career
House Physician, Middlesex Hospital, 1945; Demonstrator, 1945–48, Asst Lectr, 1948–49, in Pharmacology, Middlesex Hospital Medical School.
Professor of Physiology, McGill University, Montreal, 1949–62; Deputy Director, University Clinic, Montreal General Hospital, 1957-62.
Sheild Professor of Pharmacology, University of Cambridge, 1962–71; Fellow of Downing College, Cambridge, 1962–71, Hon. Fellow 1972
Director, National Institute for Medical Research, 1971-82.
President, the International Union of Basic and Clinical Pharmacology 1972-75

Personal life
Burgen was married to British crystallographer Olga Kennard. He died on 26 May 2022, at the age of 100.

Honours
Burgen was appointed Fellow of the Royal Society in 1964, Fellow of the Royal College of Physicians in 1969, and was knighted in the 1976 New Year Honours. Burgen was elected a Foreign Associate of the National Academy of Sciences of the United States in 1987. He became an Honorary Fellow of Darwin College, Cambridge, in 1989. He was founding President and praesis perpetua honoris causa of Academia Europaea.

References

1922 births
2022 deaths
British pharmacologists
20th-century British medical doctors
Fellows of the Royal College of Physicians
Fellows of the Royal Society
Knights Bachelor
Academic staff of McGill University
Members of Academia Europaea
Masters of Darwin College, Cambridge
Foreign associates of the National Academy of Sciences
Fellows of Downing College, Cambridge
Alumni of University College London
People educated at Christ's College, Finchley
British centenarians
Men centenarians
Professors of the University of Cambridge
People from the London Borough of Hackney